Seithur is a small panchayat town in Rajapalayam taluk, Virudhunagar district in the Indian state of Tamil Nadu. It is located on the Rajapalayam to Tenkasi  National Highway 744, 65 km from Courtallam, and 5km from the  Sasthakovil river. There are many attractions near Seithur. The Tamil film actor Samuthirakani was born here in 1973.

Nature
The nature around the Western Ghats is green and forested.

Demographics

As reported in the 2001 India census, Seithur had a population of 18,012. The total population consisted of 49% males and 51% females. Seithur had an average literacy rate 82%, greater than the national average of 59.5%, with male literacy being 88%, and female literacy being 77%. In Seithur, 11% of the population is under 6 years of age.

Facilities
There are many nurseries, a primary school, and a government secondary school, a government hospital, two police stations: a SUB-REGISTRAR office that is the head facility for the nearest 18 villages all places freely donated by seithur Zamindar

Economy
Agriculture is the main industry in the town, which produces paddy, cotton, coconut and sugarcane. Other common professions in the town include tailoring, and work in mills.

References

Cities and towns in Virudhunagar district